The 1st IAAF World Road Running Championships were held in Debrecen, Hungary on 8 October 2006, the women's race starting at 11:00 and the men's race at 13:00. This was the first time the title of World Road Running Champion had been competed for, with this competition replacing the IAAF World Half Marathon Championships in the international sporting calendar. 140 athletes from 39 nations took part in the two races.

As well as individual honours, there is also a team event where the times of the first three runners home from each country are added together to produce the team standings. Only nations with at least three competitors entered in the race are eligible for this competition.

The race was notable for having the first disabled athlete to take part in a world championship athletics event. Mark Brown, who was competing for Gibraltar, lost his left arm in a traffic accident in 1981.

Detailed reports on the event and an appraisal of the results were given both
for the men's race and for the women's race.

The course

The total race distance was 20 kilometres, and consisted of four laps around a 5000-metre course. The race started and finished in front of the main building of the University of Debrecen (pictured left) on the northern edge of the city, and travelled in a clockwise direction around nearby parkland.

The runners started on Egyetem Square, outside the university, before heading around the circular Nagyerdei Avenue. Most of the course followed Nagyerdei Avenue, with two detours onto the roads inside the circle, passing the thermal baths and the Aquaticum Thermal & Wellness Hotel, before rounding the boating lake, passing the Nagyerdõ Stadium and the Hunguest Nagyerdõ Hotel. The race then headed back to Egyetem Square to complete the lap.

Medallists

Race results
Complete results were published for the men's race, for the women's race, for men's team, and for women's team.

Men's

Women's

Team results

Men's

Women's

Participation
The participation of 140 athletes (83 men/57 women) from 39 countries is reported.

 (1)
 (4)
 (1)
 (1)
 (1)
 (8)
 (1)
 (2)
 (6)
 (9)
 (2)
 (5)
 (1)
 (1)
 (10)
 (2)
 (8)
 (9)
 (8)
 (1)
 (1)
 (3)
 (3)
 (1)
 (1)
 (2)
 (5)
 (5)
 (6)
 (1)
 (5)
 (4)
 (2)
 (4)
 (1)
 (2)
 (10)
 (2)
 (1)

See also
2006 in athletics (track and field)
IAAF
Road running

References

External links
IAAF World Road Running Championships - Debrecen 2006 - History
debrecen2006.hu, website of the race organisers

World Road Running Championships
R
World Athletics Half Marathon Championships
International athletics competitions hosted by Hungary